Oleksii Fedyna (born 8 October 1987) is a visually impaired Paralympic swimmer from Ukraine competing in S13 events.

Career
Oleksii competed in seven events at the 2008 Summer Paralympics in Beijing winning five medals, three of them gold.  He made the final, but missed out on medals in the 100m butterfly and 400m freestyle, he also won silver medals in both the 100m backstroke and freestyle, on both occasions behind Greece's Charalampos Taiganidis who set world records in both events, his gold medals came in the 50m freestyle, 100m breaststroke and 200m medley setting world records in each of the events in the process.

He is a former IPC world record holder for his classification for the 50 metres freestyle and 100 metres breaststroke events.

References

External links 
 

1988 births
Living people
Ukrainian male freestyle swimmers
S13-classified Paralympic swimmers
Paralympic swimmers of Ukraine
Paralympic gold medalists for Ukraine
Paralympic silver medalists for Ukraine
Paralympic bronze medalists for Ukraine
Swimmers at the 2008 Summer Paralympics
Swimmers at the 2012 Summer Paralympics
Swimmers at the 2016 Summer Paralympics
Medalists at the 2008 Summer Paralympics
Medalists at the 2012 Summer Paralympics
Medalists at the 2016 Summer Paralympics
Medalists at the World Para Swimming Championships
Medalists at the World Para Swimming European Championships
World record holders in paralympic swimming
Paralympic medalists in swimming
Ukrainian male breaststroke swimmers
Ukrainian male backstroke swimmers
Ukrainian male medley swimmers
21st-century Ukrainian people